N-methyltransferase may refer to:

(RS)-1-benzyl-1,2,3,4-tetrahydroisoquinoline N-methyltransferase
3-hydroxy-16-methoxy-2,3-dihydrotabersonine N-methyltransferase
Amine N-methyltransferase
Anthranilate N-methyltransferase
(cytochrome c)-arginine N-methyltransferase
(myelin basic protein)-arginine N-methyltransferase
Calmodulin-lysine N-methyltransferase
Carnosine N-methyltransferase
(S)-coclaurine-N-methyltransferase
Dimethylhistidine N-methyltransferase
Glycine N-methyltransferase
Guanidinoacetate N-methyltransferase
Histamine N-methyltransferase
Histone methyltransferase
(cytochrome c)-lysine N-methyltransferase
(ribulose-bisphosphate carboxylase)-lysine N-methyltransferase
Methylamine—glutamate N-methyltransferase
Nicotinamide N-methyltransferase
Nicotinate N-methyltransferase
Phenylethanolamine N-methyltransferase
Phosphatidylethanolamine N-methyltransferase
Phosphatidyl-N-methylethanolamine N-methyltransferase
Phosphoethanolamine N-methyltransferase
Protein-histidine N-methyltransferase
Putrescine N-methyltransferase
Pyridine N-methyltransferase
(S)-tetrahydroprotoberberine N-methyltransferase
Trimethylsulfonium—tetrahydrofolate N-methyltransferase
Tryptamine N-methyltransferase
Tyramine N-methyltransferase